The Rayeen or Raeen is a Punjabi Sunni Muslim community associated with the Arain tribe. They are big and small level farmers mainly in the Nainital, Rampur, Bareilly and Pilibheet regions. of Western part of the state of Uttar Pradesh and Uttarakhand in India. They migrated from Sirsa district of Punjab (in present day Haryana).

References

Muslim communities of Uttar Pradesh
Punjabi tribes
Social groups of Punjab, India
Social groups of Punjab, Pakistan